Đồng Hóa may refer to several places in Vietnam, including:

 , a rural commune of Kim Bảng District
 Đồng Hóa, Quảng Bình, a rural commune of Tuyên Hóa District

See also
 Đông Hòa (disambiguation)